Peter Leonard Brooke, Baron Brooke of Sutton Mandeville,  (born 3 March 1934) is a British politician. A member of the Conservative Party, he served in the Cabinet under Prime Ministers Margaret Thatcher and John Major, and was a Member of Parliament (MP) representing the Cities of London and Westminster from 1977 to 2001.

Early life
Brooke is the son of Henry Brooke, Baron Brooke of Cumnor, a former Home Secretary, and Barbara Brooke, Baroness Brooke of Ystradfellte.  His parents were one of the few married couples where both partners held noble titles in their own right.  His younger brother was the judge Sir Henry Brooke.  He was educated at Marlborough College and Balliol College, Oxford, (where he was President of the Oxford Union) before going on to the Harvard Business School in the United States. After leaving university he worked as a headhunter and was Chairman of Spencer Stuart.

Parliamentary career
After unsuccessfully challenging Neil Kinnock at the Labour stronghold of Bedwellty in October 1974, he was elected as MP for the Cities of London and Westminster in a by-election in 1977. He was sworn into the Privy Council in 1988. He was made Chairman of the Conservative Party in 1987, and then Secretary of State for Northern Ireland in 1989. His speech, made in November 1990 in London, is largely credited with bringing Sinn Féin to the negotiating table, in which he declared that Britain had no "selfish strategic or economic interest" in Northern Ireland and would accept unification, if the people wished it.

In January 1992, Brooke appeared on the Irish chat show, The Late Late Show. After a pleasant interview, the presenter, Gay Byrne, coaxed and goaded the unwilling Brooke into singing "Oh My Darling, Clementine", on a day when seven Protestant construction workers had been killed by an IRA bomb. Many unionists were outraged at what seemed to be a moment clearly out of touch with grieving families, and requested the resignation of Brooke. The incident was a factor in Brooke's being dropped from his position after the April 1992 general election, although Brooke claimed he had offered his resignation after the incident.

After leaving the Cabinet, Brooke stood unsuccessfully for the position of Speaker of the House of Commons. The House instead elected the Labour MP Betty Boothroyd to the role, with several Conservative MPs voting against Brooke on the grounds that he had too recently been in the Cabinet and was thus insufficiently close to the backbenches. Brooke then remained on the backbenches for a short time, before being brought back into the Cabinet later in the year as Secretary of State for National Heritage, a role he held until 1994. During his time as Heritage Secretary, he oversaw the restoration of Windsor Castle following the fire that had struck the State Apartments in 1992.

Later life
Brooke stepped down as an MP at the 2001 general election and was created a life peer as Baron Brooke of Sutton Mandeville, of Sutton Mandeville in the County of Wiltshire, on 30 July 2001. He was Chairman of the Association of Conservative Peers. He was appointed Companion of Honour, as his father had been, in 1992. He retired from the House of Lords in September 2015.

Coat of arms

References

External links 

|-

|-

|-

|-

|-

1934 births
Living people
Alumni of Balliol College, Oxford
British Secretaries of State
Chairmen of the Conservative Party (UK)
Conservative Party (UK) MPs for English constituencies
Conservative Party (UK) life peers
Fellows of King's College London
Harvard Business School alumni
Members of the Order of the Companions of Honour
Members of the Privy Council of the United Kingdom
People educated at Marlborough College
People of The Troubles (Northern Ireland)
Politics of the City of London
Politics of the City of Westminster
Presidents of the Oxford Union
RTÉ controversies
Secretaries of State for Northern Ireland
UK MPs 1974–1979
UK MPs 1979–1983
UK MPs 1983–1987
UK MPs 1987–1992
UK MPs 1992–1997
UK MPs 1997–2001
United Kingdom Paymasters General
Sons of life peers
Brooke
Conservative Party (UK) councillors
Councillors in the London Borough of Camden
Life peers created by Elizabeth II